Michael Colton Dixon (born October 19, 1991) is an American singer-songwriter and musician from Murfreesboro, Tennessee. He placed seventh on the eleventh season of American Idol.

Early life
Colton Dixon was born Michael Colton Dixon on October 19, 1991, to parents Michael and Teresa Dixon. He was born and raised in a middle-class family in Murfreesboro, Tennessee, along with younger sister, Schyler. His father runs a face painting/air brush company, and his family has a Jack Russell dog named Ozzy, and a cat named Chloe. Besides being a choir member throughout high school, In 2008, he was an extra during the filming of "Hannah Montana: The Movie". He graduated from Middle Tennessee Christian School in 2010.
He is a devout Christian, and has sung at several worship services including at Saddleback Church. He and Schyler are part of a Christian rock band called Messenger. He released his debut album A Messenger with EMI-CMG/Sparrow Records on January 29, 2013. His musical influences include Paramore, Thirty Seconds to Mars, Lifehouse, Evanescence, Switchfoot, Skillet and The Fray.

American Idol

Overview
Colton Dixon originally auditioned in the tenth season, along with his sister Schyler, at the Nashville auditions. However, neither of them ended up in the Top 24. Dixon performed on The Ellen DeGeneres Show on March 3, 2011.

Dixon returned in season 11, but he did not plan to audition, initially planning to merely accompany his sister Schyler to her audition. The judges implored Dixon to audition as well, where he sang David Cook's "Permanent". Both he and Schyler were awarded golden tickets. Schyler was cut yet again during the Las Vegas round, which brought her to tears.

On his final judgement performance, Dixon performed Coldplay's "Fix You" and dedicated it to his sister, Schyler. On February 23, 2012, Dixon was placed in the season 11 Top 25. In the semi-finals, he performed Paramore's "Decode". He was one of the top five male vote getters and advanced into the Top 13.
Guest performer on the Top 13 Results night and runner-up of American Idol season 10 Lauren Alaina named Dixon and fellow contestant Jessica Sanchez as her two favorites to win the competition. His elimination on April 19, 2012, was considered a big surprise because he had never been in the bottom three.

Performances/results

  Due to the judges using their one save on Jessica Sanchez, the Top 7 remained intact for another week.

Post-Idol career

2012–14: Post-Idol and A Messenger
Following his elimination, Dixon appeared on various shows. He performed a rendition of "Everything" by Lifehouse on Live! with Kelly on April 23, 2012. He treated Access Hollywood viewers to a reprise of the same swan song. He had a guest appearance on the Today Show on April 24, 2012. He came back to The Ellen DeGeneres Show to perform Billy Joel’s "Piano Man" on April 26, 2012. Dixon and fellow contestant Elise Testone performed on The Tonight Show with Jay Leno on April 27, 2012. He was invited to the White House Correspondents Dinner as a special guest of the Christian Broadcasting Network on April 28, 2012. He also started collaborating with Brandon Heath. He debuted an original song called "Never Gone" at the American Idols LIVE! Tour 2012. Colton says he wants his debut album to feature "faith-based music" without alienating a wider audience.

He released the original song he performed on the Idol tour, "Never Gone", on iTunes September 25, 2012, which is included on his debut album. His debut single entitled "You Are" hit U.S. radio airwaves on October 19, 2012, and was released on iTunes on October 30, 2012. On January 3, 2013, Dixon led the song "Jesus Paid It All" at the Passion 2013 Conference. On January 29, 2013, Dixon released his album A Messenger through Sparrow Records, which sold 22,000 copies in its first week. It debuted at number 15 on the Billboard 200, number one on the U.S. Christian Chart and number one on the U.S. Gospel Chart. Dixon and Jessica Sanchez held a concert at the Smart Araneta Coliseum in Manila on February 14. Dixon and Josh Wilson are supporting Third Day on The Miracle Tour, the tour started on February 21, 2013, in Fairfax, Virginia and ends on May 19, 2013, in Orlando, Florida. Dixon's sister, Schyler, was also on the tour for some dates. Dixon appeared on the twelfth season of American Idol on March 28, 2013, on the Top 8 results show singing his new single "Love Has Come for Me". The tour will end in California per Third Day. He went on the Hits Deep Tour with TobyMac in November and December 2013.

Dixon re-released A Messenger on January 7, 2014.

2014–15: Anchor and The Calm Before the Storm
It has been announced that he plans on releasing his second album in the summer of 2014. The lead single, "More of You", was released to iTunes on June 24, 2014. On June 19, 2014, Dixon revealed that his sophomore studio album would be titled Anchor and would be released on August 19, 2014, along with the album's artwork.

On July 26, 2015, Colton announced via Twitter that he will participate in This is Not a Test Tour with tobyMac and Britt Nicole. An album, The Calm Before the Storm will be released on September 11 that will contain dual EPs, Calm, a collection of acoustic songs and Storm, a compilation of remixed tracks, that will contain songs from A Messenger and Anchor, including versions of "You Are", "Never Gone" and "More of You".

2016–2020: Identity
Dixon released a single, "All That Matters", on January 13, 2017, and his new album, Identity, was released on March 24, 2017.

Personal life
In 2012, Dixon started dating Annie Coggeshall. They became engaged in September 2015, and wed on January 8, 2016. In February 2020, they announced they were expecting their first child, expected in autumn. On August 16, 2020, they welcomed twin daughters.

Discography

Studio albums

Extended plays

Singles

Promotional singles

Other charting songs

Music videos

Awards

GMA Dove Awards

References

External links
 Official website
 Colton Dixon on American Idol
 

1991 births
Living people
19 Recordings artists
21st-century American male singers
21st-century American singers
21st-century American pianists
American alternative rock musicians
American Idol participants
American performers of Christian music
American Protestants
American rock keyboardists
American rock pianists
American male pianists
Keytarists
Singers from Tennessee
People from Murfreesboro, Tennessee
Sparrow Records artists